The pale-winged starling (Onychognathus nabouroup) is a species of starling in the family Sturnidae. It is found in Angola, Botswana, Namibia, and South Africa.

Habitat

This starling is found in arid and semi-arid areas in South-western Africa, mainly in areas with rocky terrain, cliffs and gorges.

Ecology
The pale-winged starling is a generalist omnivore, feeding on a range of fruit and insects.

References

External links

Pale-winged starling - Species text in The Atlas of Southern African Birds

pale-winged starling
Birds of Southern Africa
pale-winged starling
Taxonomy articles created by Polbot